The following is a list of Cuban painters.

Colonial Period

Miguel Arias Bardou
Guillermo Collazo
José Nicolás de la Escalera
Vicente Escobar
Víctor Patricio de Landaluze
José Abreu Morell
José Joaquín Tejada

Early Republic

Antonio Sanchez Araujo
Armando Menocal
Antonio Rodriguez Morey
Leopoldo Romañach

The Vanguard

Eduardo Abela
Cundo Bermúdez
Víctor Manuel García Valdés
Antonio Gattorno
Wifredo Lam
Fidelio Ponce de León
Amelia Peláez
Marcelo Pogolotti
René Portocarrero
Carlos Enriquez Gomez
Juan Ramon Valdez Gomez

The Moderns

José Bernal
Hugo Consuegra
Agustín Cárdenas
Mario Carreño
Consuelo Castañeda
Rolando López Dirube
Antonia Eiriz
Agustín Fernández (artist)
Lourdes Gomez Franca
Ángel Acosta León
Raúl Martínez
José María Mijares
Servando Cabrera Moreno
Dionisio Perkins
José Rodríguez Fuster
Loló Soldevilla
Rafael Soriano (painter)

Contemporary

A–M

Jeannine Achón
Ana Albertina Delgado Álvarez
Angel Delgado Fuentes
Baruj Salinas
José Bedia Valdés
Julio Breff
Adriano Buergo
Luis Enrique Camejo
Humberto Castro
Rafael Consuegra
Xavier Cortada
José Ramón Díaz Alejandro
Ofill Echevarria
Carlos Estévez (artist)
Roberto Fabelo
Emilio Falero
Miguel Fleitas
Juan Gonzalez
Josignacio
Kcho
Julio Larraz
Roel Caboverde Llacer
Rubén Torres Llorca
Luis Marín
Juan T. Vázquez Martín
Manuel Mendive

N–Z

Adriano Nicot
Pedro Pablo Oliva
Gina Pellón
Sandra Ramos
Roberto Álvarez Ríos
Miguel Rodez
Emilio Hector Rodriguez
Juan Andrés Rodríguez known as El Monje
Gilberto Andrés Romero Pino
José Ángel Rosabal Fajardo
Zilia Sánchez Domínguez
Tomás Sánchez
Cesar Santos
Raul Santoserpa
Jesús Selgas Cepero
José Omar Torres López
Carlos Trillo Name
Zafra
Juan Ramon Valdez Gomez
Fernando Velázquez Vigil
Pedro Vizcaíno
Rafael Zarza Gonzalez

See also

 Cuban art
 List of Cuban artists
 Lists of painters by nationality

References

Painters
Cuban